Amor Mío ("My Love") is a Spanish language comedy telecomedy, produced in Argentina by Telefe and for Mexico by Televisa.  This romantic comedy features Abril Juárez and Marcos Sinclair, two singles who are forced to share an apartment in Buenos Aires even though they cannot stand each other.

Two versions of this show were shot at the Telefe studios in Buenos Aires.  The first, which aired in Argentina, starred Romina Yan and Damián de Santo. The second, aimed at a Mexican audience, stars Vanessa Guzmán and Raúl Araiza.

Cast

See also
List of Amor Mio episodes

External links
 

Spanish-language telenovelas
2005 Argentine television series debuts
2005 Argentine television series endings
Argentine telenovelas